ML Motorsports was an American professional stock car racing team that last competed in the NASCAR Nationwide Series. It was owned jointly by Mary Louise Miller and her daughter, Stephanie Mullen, making it the first confirmed NASCAR team to be owned jointly by a mother and daughter team. The team fielded the No. 70 Chevrolet from 2006–2013.

ARCA Series

Car No. 67 History 
ML Motorsports debuted in 1999 in the ARCA Bondo/Mar-Hyde Series. It fielded the No. 67 Biomet/EBI Sports Medicine Chevy at the season-opening First Plus Financial 200 for Jimmy Kitchens, who finished 12th. Kitchens ran another race for the team at Atlanta, before leaving the team to concentrate on his Busch Series ride with Carroll Racing. He was replaced for the next three races by Andy Hillenburg, who registered a best finish of 8th at Salem Speedway. Kitchens returned to the team at this time and drove the next six races, his best finish coming at Pocono, where he finished sixth. After taking the next several races off, ML Racing returned to run the final four races of the season with Brian Ross and had a career-best finish of fourth at the season finale at Atlanta. Ross joined the team for a full season in 2000. With sponsorship from Biomet, Damon RV, Invisible Glass, and Stoner Care Car Products, Ross won two poles, had nine top-fives (including two second-place finishes) and was named Rookie of the Year.

In 2001, Ross left the series and was replaced by Jason Jarrett. He won at Kansas Speedway and finished second in the points, winning Rookie of the Year honors. He had fourteen top-tens in 2002, and sixteen in 2003, and did not finish worse than third in points in either of those years, but went winless during both seasons. ML got new sponsorship from Bennigan's and Gladiator GarageWorks in 2004, in which Jarrett won his second and final race at Salem. He was replaced by Chad Blount in 2005 and Foretravel Motorcoach became the team's new sponsor. Blount won four times before the team suspended operations for the rest of the season to focus on building its Busch Series operation. It returned to the series briefly to run five races in 2005 with Justin Diercks driving. They only finished one race, a fifteenth-place finish at Kentucky Speedway.

Car No. 97 History 
ML Motorsports ran a second team part-time beginnining in 2001. Dennis English debuted the No. 33 car at Chicagoland Speedway, finishing 33rd after an early oil leak. A few races later, Kevin Belmont ran the No. 51 at Toledo Speedway, but finished 29th after transmission failure.

In 2002, the team ran the No. 75 and No. 97 entries driven by Red Farmer in a partnership with Bob Schact. Farmer earned two top-ten finishes in five races, his best finish being a 4th at the DuQuois State Fairgrounds.

Nationwide Series 

ML Motorsports made its NASCAR debut at 2006 at Richmond International Raceway with Diercks driving and Foretravel sponsoring. They qualified twenty-eighth but finished last after a wreck. They ran six more races that season with a best finish of twenty-eighth at Gateway International Raceway. The combo returned in 2007 for seven additional races, with two twenty-fourth-place finishes. Diercks was fired from the team and replaced by Mark Green, who ran ten races and had a best finish of nineteenth. In 2008, Green and the team attempted twenty-one races, qualifying for nineteenth, and had its first top-five finish at Talladega Superspeedway, where Green finished fifth. The next season, Green was released after four races, and Shelby Howard took over as driver. In seventeen starts, Howard finished in the top-twenty seven times.

Howard returned in 2010 and had a best finish of twelfth twice in twenty-one starts. That year, ML formed a partnership with Jay Robinson Racing to allow Robinson to enter its No. 49 car using ML's number and owner points during races ML would not enter. This allowed ML to remain eligible for the top-30 exemption in owner points, so that it would not fail to qualify for any races that it attempted. Green would run the races that JRR fielded, earning a best finish of nineteenth. This arrangement continued in 2011 with Dennis Setzer driving in the JRR/ML races. Howard began 2011 as driver, but was replaced by both David Stremme and Scott Wimmer on a rotating basis. Stremme got the team's best finish of the season at Richmond when he finished ninth.

In 2012, rookie Johanna Long became the team's primary driver. During the races ML didn't enter, the 70 was independently run by NEMCO-Jay Robinson Racing with Tony Raines, Charles Lewandoski, Derrike Cope, and David Green sharing driving duties. The team primarily ran Toyotas in those events.

Johanna Long drove the car again in 2013 but the team closed its doors in January 2014. The team finished most of the races ran, but never had the sponsorship or resources to run a full schedule. All assets of the team were sold to Derrike Cope and his team Derrike Cope Racing.

References

External links
Mary Louise Miller NASCAR Owner Statistics

American auto racing teams
ARCA Menards Series teams
Companies based in Indiana
Defunct NASCAR teams
Auto racing teams established in 1999
1999 establishments in Indiana